Barkow may refer to:

People
Al Barkow (born 1932), American journalist.
Ben Barkow (born 1956), British librarian.
Frank Barkow (born 1957), American architect.
Jerome H. Barkow, Canadian anthropologist.
Rachel Barkow (born 1971), American law professor.
Sally Barkow, American Olympic sailor.

Places
Mount Barkow, a mountain on the Antarctic.
Barkow (Mecklenburg-Vorpommern), a sub-division of Barkhagen, Mecklenburg-Vorpommern, Germany